Derek Stewart may refer to:

 Derek Steward, New Zealand sprinter and hurdler
 Derek Stewart (footballer) (born 1948), Scottish footballer